Hall's Bridge, also known as Sheeder-Hall Bridge, is an historic, wooden covered bridge which is located in East Vincent Township and West Vincent Township, Chester County, Pennsylvania.  

It was listed on the National Register of Historic Places in 1973.

History and architectural features
It is the oldest covered bridge in Chester County, and crosses French Creek, just downstream of its confluence with Birch Run.

It was listed on the National Register of Historic Places in 1973.

References 
 

Covered bridges on the National Register of Historic Places in Pennsylvania
Covered bridges in Chester County, Pennsylvania
Bridges completed in 1850
Wooden bridges in Pennsylvania
Bridges in Chester County, Pennsylvania
National Register of Historic Places in Chester County, Pennsylvania
Road bridges on the National Register of Historic Places in Pennsylvania
Burr Truss bridges in the United States
1850 establishments in Pennsylvania